Picamar is a colorless, hydrocarbon oil extracted from the creosote of beechwood tar with a peculiar odor and bitter taste. It consists of derivatives of pyrogallol. It was discovered by German chemist Carl Reichenbach in the 1830s. Picamar can be used to lubricate machinery.

Chemical and physical properties
The exact composition of picamar is unknown. According to Pastrovich, picamar is a monomethyl ether of propyl-pyrogallol. Picamar is colorless with a peculiar, peppermint-like odor and bitter taste. It is soluble in alcohol and sparingly soluble in water. Picamar reduces the red oxide of mercury to its metallic state. It reacts with nitric acid to become a reddish-brown, greasy substance and can also dissolve camphor, resin, and benzoic acids.

History
The name "picamar" is derived from the Latin phrase in pice amarum (meaning "bitter principle of tar"). It was discovered by German chemist Carl Reichenbach in the 1830s as one of the six principles of beechwood tar, along with other substances as capnomor and eupione that were "met with less notice".

Applications
Picamar is used for greasing machinery and preventing them from rusting.

References

Hydrocarbons
Phenols